Angelina Beck (born 31 August 2004) is a Liechtensteiner footballer who plays as a forward for FC Triesen and for the Liechtenstein national football team.

International career
Beck made her senior debut for Liechtenstein in a friendly against Gibraltar on 26 November 2021.

Career statistics

International

References

External links
 Angelina Beck at the Liechtenstein Football Association

2004 births
Living people
Women's association football forwards
Liechtenstein women's international footballers
Liechtenstein women's footballers